Saint Chuniald (or Conald, Cunibald, Chunibald, Kuniald) was an early Irish priest and missionary who worked for many years in Germany.
He lived in the 7th century.

Butler's life

According to Alban Butler,

O'Hanlon's notes

John O'Hanlon discusses Chuniald in his Lives of the Irish saints (1873).
He notes that no special record exists of the acts of Saint Rupert's companions, Saints Chuniald and Gislar, if any such existed.
Many writers refer to them as companions of Saint Rupert during his missionary career in Germany, so it may be assumed they were born in Ireland around the middle of the 7th century.
However some, including the Hollandist Father Constantine Suyskens, thought that Rupert, Chuniald and Gisilar were natives of Gaul.
Radler states that although the three were sent from eastern France to convert the Norici, they all were born in ancient Scotia or Hibernia.
In 773 or 774 the relics of the saints were transferred to a church dedicated to Rupert in Salzburg.
The relics were transferred again in 993 and 1315, but Chuniald is not mentioned in reports of the later transfers.

Notes

Citations

Sources

 
 

Medieval Irish saints